Jim Prideaux is a fictional character created by John le Carré. He appears in Tinker Tailor Soldier Spy, with the book's events alternating between his point of view and that of George Smiley, and a minor character in A Legacy of Spies. He is the head of the "scalphunters," a division of MI6 (called "The Circus" in le Carre's books) dedicated to especially dangerous counterintelligence missions often involving violence or assassinations. Prideaux's betrayal, and subsequent capture, following a botched mission in Czechoslovakia is the jumping off point for the events of the book. The character has been featured in both cinematic adaptations of the book, with each presenting a markedly different portrayal of the character.

Fictional biography
Born to "parents in European banking" with a "small aristo" background (his uncle being Comte Henri de Sainte-Yvonne) Prideaux was raised abroad but attended Oxford, in addition to studying language in France. Although put down for Eton College, he did not attend it, instead studying at a Jesuit day-school in Prague. Smiley recalls that Jim was more athletically gifted than academically, although he came to excel in linguistics and became a polyglot. He has a gruff demeanor, which Smiley frequently likens to that of a soldier, and often speaks in short, precise sentences; despite this, he is essentially kind, if not harsh, and has a particular soft spot for children. During his time at Oxford, Prideaux befriended Bill Haydon, who recruited him to MI6 for his athletic prowess; the book heavily implies that the two men became lovers, with Prideaux becoming agitated and defensive when he hears people speak ill of Haydon in his presence.

Prideaux served in World War II, with his record being called "distinguished." Following the war, he briefly worked as a teacher before rejoining the Circus. Eventually, he was appointed head of "Scalphunters", a section of reckless and volatile agents kept on retainer for particularly dangerous missions involving violence and assassinations. Prideaux's military background, harsh bearing, and professional competence serve to make him an ideal head of the section, and it flourishes under his command. When the head of the Circus, Control, comes to suspect that it has been infiltrated by the KGB, he sees Prideaux as the ideal candidate to travel to Czechoslovakia on a secret operation code-named "Testify" to interrogate an alleged defector about the mole's identity. "Testify" turns out to be a trap set up by the mole and his controller to disgrace the Circus, and Prideaux is shot and captured, enduring months of torture. Control is forced into retirement for making the Circus appear paranoid and for losing Prideaux behind enemy lines. Prideaux is presumed dead by a large part of the Circus, though Haydon (who is actually the mole) arranges to have Prideaux repatriated. In compensation for his torture, and to distance him from the Circus, Prideaux is given a small pension and a gratuity, with which he acquires an Alvis. He is set up with a post as supply teacher, teaching French at a remote prep school. His gunshot wounds have permanently damaged his spine, which was shoddily repaired by incompetent surgeons, and left him with a curvature resembling a hunchback, although he keeps fit through solitary games of squash and walks through the surrounding countryside. Prideaux's release and exile from The Circus act as the jumping-off point for the events of Tinker Tailor.

A year following Testify, George Smiley is tasked by Whitehall with identifying the mole, after one of Prideaux's Scalphunters, Ricki Tarr, escapes Hong Kong with information confirming his existence. The book alternates between Smiley's investigation and Prideaux's life as a schoolteacher, as he himself attempts to adjust to civilian life while dealing with PTSD. During his investigation, Smiley learns that Prideaux is still alive, and travels to the prep school to interview him about the events leading up to his capture. Smiley finds Prideaux leading an uneasy but essentially peaceful existence at the prep school, living in a dilapidated caravan on the school grounds and mentoring several of the boys in espionage techniques, though none of them quite realize what they're being taught. Prideaux has, in particular, taken a liking to an overweight, bespectacled boy named Bill Roach, to whom he has become a paternal figure in the absence of the boy's own neglectful father.

Smiley learns that Prideaux informed Haydon of Testify before departing; Prideaux had independently surmised that Haydon was the mole, and wanted to warn him about the potential his cover might be blown. Haydon, in turn, allowed Prideaux to be shot, but made special arrangements with his KGB contacts to have Prideaux released rather than killed. Prideaux has lived in denial ever since, but Smiley's appearance and interview force him to come to terms with Haydon's betrayal, and Prideaux takes an unexplained leave of absence from the school. In the interim, Haydon is unmasked and arrested as the mole, and arrangements are made to trade him to the Soviet Union in exchange for several Western prisoners. The night before his scheduled transfer, Haydon is found dead on the prison grounds after being given permission to take a walk. His neck has been violently broken; on the basis of an earlier scene in which Prideaux breaks the neck of an owl that flew into his classroom, and his threat to break another man's neck, the book strongly implies that Prideaux is the killer.

The final chapter of the book deals with Prideaux's ultimate re-assimilation into civilian life: He returns to the school, and, after a period of apparent mourning for Haydon, apparently recovers from his PTSD and resumes his teaching duties with a newfound vigor. The book ends with Prideaux celebrating with Roach after helping him successfully stage a class play, jokingly telling parents that they went to school together.

In A Legacy of Spies, Peter Guillam finds Prideaux at the same school, still in intermittent contact with Smiley. Still living in his caravan in the Dip, Prideaux made himself indispensable in the wake of the former headmaster, Thursgood, abandoning his family and the school on a "moonlight flit with the school chef", taking with him fees paid by parents; Prideaux, using some of his own money and supported by a banker of Smiley's acquaintance as well as some parents who "chipped in", kept the school running ("Well, after that, school's not going to sling me out, is it?").

Portrayals
Prideaux was played by Ian Bannen in the 1979 television serial based on the novel. Bannen's portrayal is in keeping with the Prideaux of the book, presenting him as a rough-edged, no-nonsense military man who speaks in short, clipped sentences and who is sometimes overtly aggressive to Smiley. The series also shows the final encounter between Jim and Bill (Ian Richardson), including Bill's killing.

In the 2011 film adaptation, he was played by Mark Strong. This adaptation emphasizes Prideaux's linguistic and intellectual abilities, presenting him as more scholarly and reserved than the book or miniseries. Nonetheless, he is still depicted as a competent soldier. In the film version, Jim is captured at a cafe in the Hungarian capital of Budapest, rather than in the woods near the Czech city of Brno as in the book and series. At the end of the film Jim shoots Haydon (Colin Firth) to death with a rifle rather than break his neck.

References

Fictional British secret agents
John le Carré
Novel series
Fictional English people
Characters in British novels of the 20th century
Literary characters introduced in 1973
Fictional LGBT characters in literature